James Smith Manning (June 1, 1859 – July 28, 1938) was a justice of the North Carolina Supreme Court from 1909 to 1911, and Attorney General of North Carolina from 1916 to 1925.

Born in Pittsboro, North Carolina as the son of John Manning Jr., the United States House of Representatives, Manning graduated from the University of North Carolina and practiced law in Durham, North Carolina. He served in the North Carolina House of Representatives and the North Carolina Senate, and was appointed by Governor William Walton Kitchin to a seat on the state supreme court to a seat vacated by the elevation of Henry G. Connor to a federal judgeship. Manning was defeated in a bid for the Democratic nomination for reelection to the seat in July 1910. Manning was elected Attorney General in 1916. He served in that office until 1925, and then returned to private practice for the remainder of his career.

Manning died in his home in Raleigh, North Carolina, at the age of 79. He was the father of lawyer and future Adjutant General of North Carolina, John H. Manning.

References

External links
Address of R. P. Reade, April 11, 1950, Presenting the portrait of James Smith Manning to the North Carolina Supreme Court

1859 births
1938 deaths
People from Pittsboro, North Carolina
University of North Carolina alumni
Democratic Party members of the North Carolina House of Representatives
Democratic Party North Carolina state senators
Justices of the North Carolina Supreme Court
North Carolina Attorneys General